Labeo quadribarbis is a species of fish in the genus Labeo. It is known only from the Middle Congo River in Africa.

The species has a nearly rounded body, rounded snout and two large pairs of barbels. They pose no risk to humans.

References 

Labeo
Fish described in 1963
Endemic fauna of the Democratic Republic of the Congo